Songs from the Closet is a compilation album of early demo recordings by King's X bassist / vocalist Doug Pinnick. It contains two previously unreleased songs and an audio commentary track by Pinnick.

Track listing
The World Around Me
Wars (previously unreleased)
I'll Never Get Tired of You
Fine Art of Friendship
Power of Love
The Big Picture
Ooh Song
Sometime
A Box
Human Behavior
Trash in Heaven (previously unreleased)
What I Know About Love
We Were Born to Be Loved
Faith Hope Love
Audio commentary track

2006 compilation albums
Doug Pinnick albums
King's X albums